Group W may refer to:

 Group W, Westinghouse Broadcasting
 Group W, people being considered for moral waiver by American military 
The Group W bench from "Alice's Restaurant" by Arlo Guthrie is a reference to moral waiver